Chicago Hope is an American medical drama television series, created by David E. Kelley. It originally aired on CBS from September 18, 1994, to May 4, 2000. The series is set in a fictional private charitable hospital in Chicago, Illinois.

Overview
The show starred Mandy Patinkin as Dr. Jeffrey Geiger, a hot-shot surgeon with emotional issues stemming from the psychiatric condition of his wife (played by Kim Greist), who drowned their infant son. Adam Arkin plays Dr. Aaron Shutt, a world-renowned neurosurgeon and Geiger's best friend. Thomas Gibson played Dr. Daniel Nyland, a promiscuous ER doctor and trauma surgeon who was later suspended due to his having an affair with a patient's family member and later was injured in a car crash. Dr. Keith Wilkes played by Rocky Carroll, often clashed with Nyland and was known for his back-to-basics and rough demeanor. He was good friends with Peter Berg's character, Dr. Billy Kronk. Kronk was known for his cowboyish demeanor and known to be very cocky, as showed in an episode where he cuts off a man's injured leg with a chainsaw in a scene where Kronk helps out at an accident site. Peter MacNicol, Alan Rosenberg, and Héctor Elizondo feature as the hospital's in-house attorneys and chief of staff, respectively. Christine Lahti joined in the second season as Dr. Kate Austin, a talented heart surgeon with a chip on her shoulder, vying with Geiger for the chief of surgery position. She was known fighting in a custody battle with her malicious ex-husband and businessman, Tommy Wilmette, played by Ron Silver. Mr. Wilmette did everything he could to get Austin to lose custody of their daughter. He purchased the hospital at the end of Season 2. Dr. Austin is suspended because she and her daughter go AWOL on a trip to New Zealand. Mr. Wilmette was upset because it took him three months to find his ex-wife and daughter. In Season 3,  the doctors want Mr. Wilmette to sell the hospital and the doctors would run it. The doctors viewed that Wilmette didn't know how to run a hospital and cut too many costs that involved patient care. Mr. Wilmette later met with Senator Kennedy at the White House to talk about Healthcare Reform. In Season 2, Geiger resigns from Chicago Hope after trying to save Alan Birch from a deadly gunshot wound to his heart.

Geiger adopted Birch's baby daughter. Geiger later rejoins the doctors at the end of Season 5 when he becomes Chairman of the Board and fires half of the doctors. In Season 4, Dr. Shutt became a psychiatrist and temporarily loses his ability to operate after suffering from a brain aneurysm. In Season 6, Shutt returns to Neurosurgery and works alongside Carla Gugino's character, Dr. Gina Simon.

Episodes

Chicago Hope ran six seasons, airing a total of 141 episodes.

Crossovers
Fyvush Finkel and Kathy Baker appeared as their Picket Fences characters in the first season. Likewise, Mandy Patinkin and Héctor Elizondo brought their Chicago Hope characters to Picket Fences that year. Both Adam Arkin and Lauren Holly had previously appeared on Picket Fences as a lawyer and as a deputy sheriff, respectively.

Mandy Patinkin appears in an uncredited role as Geiger in a 1995 episode of NBC's Homicide: Life on the Street. Chicago Hope producer John Tinker shot this footage as a favor to his St. Elsewhere colleague Tom Fontana.

Chicago Hope characters crossed over to Early Edition early in that show's run. Rocky Carroll, Jayne Brook, and Héctor Elizondo all guest-starred in scenes taking place in the hospital.

Characters

Production
With the exception of some infrequent on-location scenes, the vast majority of Chicago Hope was filmed on sound stages at the studios of Twentieth Century-Fox Film Corporation, located in the Century City area of Los Angeles.
Three of the cast (Harmon, Carroll and Holly) would later go on to star together in NCIS.

Firsts
The series broke a network television taboo by showing a teenager's breast after her character underwent reconstructive surgery. This was generally seen as relevant to the subject matter and went relatively uncriticized.

On November 18, 1998, Chicago Hope became the first regular series episode to be broadcast in HDTV. The episode was entitled "The Other Cheek".

Mark Harmon's character uttered the word "shit" during a trauma. Little criticism was made.

Broadcast

Domestic reruns
Reruns of Chicago Hope aired on Pop from 2010 to 2012. OWN also aired reruns of Chicago Hope on a semi-regular basis.

International
In the UK, seasons 1 and 2 originally aired on BBC One. More recently, all seasons of the show have been shown on ITV3. Starting on September 3, 2007, it began airing on Zone Romantica in the UK and Ireland. It was also shown on Sky One in the UK and Ireland in its prime time slots. In Australia, the series originally aired on The Seven Network. In Germany the first seasons were shown in the 1990s. In Hungary, the series aired on Viasat3.  In Indonesia, the series originally aired on RCTI, starting from October 1998 ended from July 2002. As of November 2013 it is airing on UK Freeview/Freesat/Sky/Eutelsat 28A/Virgin Media/WightFibre television channel True Entertainment. In New Zealand, the series originally aired on TV2, now TVNZ 2.

Home media
Revelation Films has released all 6 seasons of Chicago Hope on DVD in Region 2 (UK) for the very first time.

Reception
The pilot episode of Chicago Hope was broadcast the day before NBC's ER in a special Sunday, 8p.m. time slot. After the first week, however, the two Chicago-based hospital dramas went "head to head" in their primetime 10p.m. Thursday night slot. ER was the victor: its first season proved a ratings winner. Despite receiving critical acclaim, Chicago Hope was shifted to 9p.m. Thursdays, and ultimately to Monday nights in 1995 in a bid for higher ratings, while ER remained in its time slot.

Chicago Hope remained in the Monday slot and performed well, with ratings peaking at 11.9, with a 20 share. In the second season, however, Kelley and Patinkin decided to leave the show. The show was moved to Wednesdays at 10p.m. in 1997 to make room for the Steven Bochco drama, Brooklyn South, on Mondays. In 1999, both Kelley and Patinkin returned, with a revamped cast now including Barbara Hershey and Lauren Holly, but excluding Lahti, Peter Berg, Jayne Brook, Vondie Curtis-Hall, and Stacy Edwards. CBS also moved the show back to Thursday nights, against NBC's Frasier and ABC's Who Wants to Be a Millionaire. The show was canceled in May 2000.

In 2007, former co-stars Rocky Carroll (Dr. Keith Wilkes); Mark Harmon (Dr. Jack McNeil) and Lauren Holly (Dr. Jeremy Hanlon) worked together on the series NCIS. Holly left the show after three seasons, while Carroll remains with the cast today. Harmon would depart in 2021. In addition, Carroll has a recurring role as his NCIS character, Director Leon Vance, on that series's spin off, NCIS: Los Angeles.  Jayne Brook (Dr. Diane Grad) and Stacy Edwards have also guest starred on NCIS as well.

Thomas Gibson would later star alongside Patinkin in the highly successful Criminal Minds, as well as Shemar Moore who was a guest star on Chicago Hope during Season 4. Patinkin later left the show early in its third season.

Nielsen ratings
Seasonal rankings (based on average total viewers per episode) of Chicago Hope.

Note: Each U.S. network television season starts in late September and ends in late May, which coincides with the completion of May Nielsen ratings.

Awards and nominations
Over its six seasons, Chicago Hope was nominated for many accolades and won several, including seven Emmy Awards and a Golden Globe Awards.

Emmy awards

Golden Globe Awards

Screen Actors Guild Award

Other awards

Notes

References

External links
 Official Website
 
 

1994 American television series debuts
2000 American television series endings
1990s American workplace drama television series
2000s American workplace drama television series
1990s American medical television series
2000s American medical television series
CBS original programming
English-language television shows
Fictional hospitals
Primetime Emmy Award-winning television series
Television series by 20th Century Fox Television
Television shows set in Chicago
Television series created by David E. Kelley